Roderick "Derrick" Columnas Macutay (born September 12, 1971 in Pasig) is a Filipino mural artist and contemporary painter, known for his distinctive subject of surreal portraits of humans, robots, cyborgs and android like creatures and his signature color of monochrome blue usually with a vibrant accent color. His works range from mural paintings to oil paintings and illustrations.

Roderick studied fine art painting for four years at the University of Santo Tomas and graduated in 1992. Having formally studied art in the University of Santo Tomas and trained with Angono Masters, Derrick has always been dead-on in his critique and rendering of the way the spirit and science come to terms with one another, terms that shape the coming days.

Macutay was mentored by Salvador Juban, a protege and assistant of the late Carlos “Botong” Francisco, a National Artist and a titan in modern Philippine art.

Published Artworks 

 The First Contact (2021), National Historical Commission of the Philippines.
 Strangers (2021), National Historical Commission of the Philippines.
 Ties that come a long way (2016), Wellington Museum - Commissioned by the Philippine Embassy in Wellington New Zealand.

Contributions to Philippine Historical and Cultural Heritage 

 In 2021, three historical markers unveiled in Guiuan, Eastern Samar, Philippines, in commemoration of the Quincentennial of the First Circumnavigation of the World were based on the sketches of muralist Derrick Macutay and executed in dust marble relief by sculptors Jonas Roces and Francis Apiles.
In 2016, Macutay handled the digital graphic art of the book - Historical Atlas of the Republic (of the Philippines), published by The Presidential Communications Development and Strategic Planning Office. The book showed the development of the Philippine geopolitical landscape, the colonization of the Philippines by different foreign powers, and the expansion of Philippine national sovereignty.
 In 2014, he created a commemorative coin design and a stamp design for the 70th anniversary of the Leyte Gulf Landing in the Philippines.
 In 2013, the Philippine Postal Corp. pitched in to honor the 150th birth anniversary of Andres Bonifacio, a Philippine national hero, by issuing stamps featuring the Father of the Philippine Revolution designed by Roderick Macutay among three other artists.
In 2012, the Museo Diocesano de Pasig showcased the history of Pasig as intertwined with that of the church, from prehistoric times to the present. This was portrayed by artist Derrick Macutay in a 60 ft x 5 ft mural in acrylic exhibited at the museum hallway.

List of exhibitions
SOLO EXHIBITION

GROUP EXHIBITIONS

Awards and honors

Organizations and clubs

A.A.P. Art Association of the Philippines
Pinsel Pasig Artist Group
Gintong Sining UST
Kalipunan ng Sining at Kultura ng Pasig
Pasig Art Club
NeoAngono Artist Collective
Knights of Rizal JUAN LUNA CHAPTER Pasig

References

External links
Artist's Profile MACUTAY, RODERICK COLMINAS, Artist Profile.
DERRICK MACUTAY PAINTING EXHIBIT by Randy P. Valiente, 11:45:00 AM, November 2008.
Pasig Catholic College turns 100 by Philippine Daily Inquirer, Article 3, January 2013.
Museo Diocesano De Pasig by Josephine Darang, Philippine Daily Inquirer, November 2012.
Blessings in the old year by Josephine Darang, Philippine Daily Inquirer, December 2012.

1971 births
Living people
Filipino painters
People from Pasig
Artists from Metro Manila
University of Santo Tomas alumni